The 1923–24 Loyola Ramblers men's basketball team represents Loyola University Chicago during the 1923–24 NCAA men's basketball season. The ramblers were led by first-year head coach Leonard Sachs. The team had finished the season with an overall record of 8–11.

Schedule

|-

References

Loyola Ramblers men's basketball seasons
Loyola Ramblers
Loyola Ramblers
Loyola Ramblers